Philip Charles Holme (born 21 June 1947) was a Welsh amateur footballer who played as a forward in the Football League for Hull City and Swansea City. He was capped by Wales at amateur level. After retiring as a player due to injury in 1974, he became a manager and coach.

Personal life 
Holme has worked as an electrician

Career statistics

References 

Welsh footballers
English Football League players
Wales amateur international footballers
Association football forwards
1947 births
Sportspeople from Briton Ferry
Living people
Bridgend Town A.F.C. players
Swansea City A.F.C. players
Hull City A.F.C. players

Hull City A.F.C. non-playing staff
Afan Lido F.C. players
Cardiff City F.C. players
Inter Cardiff F.C. managers